Raúl Alpizar Aguilera (born 1 February 1977 in Mexico City) is a Mexican football manager and former player.

References

External links

1977 births
Living people
Mexican football managers
Association football defenders
Club Universidad Nacional footballers
Querétaro F.C. footballers
Club Puebla players
Lobos BUAP footballers
Liga MX players
Ascenso MX players
Footballers from Mexico City
Mexican footballers